Wayne Snyman (born 8 March 1985 in Welkom) is a South African race walker. At the 2016 Summer Olympics, he competed in the Men’s 20 km walk. He finished in 58th place with a time of 1:29:20. In 2019, he competed in the men's 20 kilometres walk at the 2019 World Athletics Championships held in Doha, Qatar. He finished in 38th place.

He competed in the men's 20 km walk at the 2020 Summer Olympics.

References

1985 births
South African male racewalkers
Olympic athletes of South Africa
Athletes (track and field) at the 2016 Summer Olympics
Athletes (track and field) at the 2020 Summer Olympics
Athletes (track and field) at the 2018 Commonwealth Games
Living people
African Games bronze medalists for South Africa
African Games medalists in athletics (track and field)
Athletes (track and field) at the 2015 African Games
Athletes (track and field) at the 2019 African Games
White South African people
Commonwealth Games competitors for South Africa